The 2009–10 Big Ten Conference women's basketball season marked the continuation of the annual tradition of competitive basketball among Big Ten Conference members.

Offseason 
 On July 30, the Women's Basketball Coaches Association (WBCA), on behalf of the Wade Coalition, announced the 2009-2010 preseason "Wade Watch" list for The State Farm Wade Trophy Division I Player of the Year. The nominees are made up of top NCAA Division I student-athletes who best embody the spirit of Lily Margaret Wade. This is based on the following criteria: game and season statistics, leadership, character, effect on their team and overall playing ability. The list of Big Ten athletes are as follows:
 Jantel Lavender, Ohio State 
 Samantha Prahalis, Ohio State 
 Jenna Smith, Illinois

Season outlook

Preseason 
 October 29: Ohio State junior Jantel Lavender was selected as the Big Ten Preseason Player of the Year by the conference coaches and a panel of media members.

Preseason polls 
 Coaches Polls
 1. Ohio State
 2. Michigan State
 3. Minnesota
 4. Purdue
 5. Iowa
 6. Illinois
 7. Penn State
 8. Northwestern
 9. Indiana
 10. Wisconsin
 11. Michigan

Preseason All-Big Ten Coaches Team 
 JENNA SMITH, Sr., F, ILL
 Allyssa DeHaan, Sr., C, MSU
 JANTEL LAVENDER, Jr., C, OSU
 Samantha Prahalis, So., G, OSU
 Tyra Grant, Sr., F, PSU

Preseason All-Big Ten Media Team 
 Jenna Smith, Sr., F, ILL
 Allyssa DeHaan, Sr., C, MSU
 JANTEL LAVENDER, Jr., C, OSU
 Samantha Prahalis, So., G, OSU
 Tyra Grant, Sr., F, PSU

Regular season

November 
 Nov. 11: The Big Ten and Big 12 Conferences announced the formation of an annual inter-conference challenge for women's basketball. The challenge will span at least two years and will begin in the fall of 2010. The series will feature a home-and-home format over the initial two-year agreement, and each of the Big 12's teams will play in each Challenge, while one Big Ten team, Wisconsin, will play two Challenge games each year.

2009 Big Ten/ACC Challenge Schedule

Rankings 
The rankings are based on the ESPN/USA Today poll.

^Final Poll = ESPN/USA Today Coaches Poll

In season honors 
Players of the week
Throughout the conference regular season, the Big Ten offices named a player of the week each Monday.

Midseason watch lists

Conference honors

National awards and honors

Statistical leaders

Postseason

NCAA Tournament

National Invitation Tournament

See also 
 2009–10 NCAA Division I women's basketball season

References